Major General Phillip David Prosser CBE is a British Army officer and engineer, who currently serves as Director Joint Support, UK Strategic Command. He previously served in the Royal Electrical and Mechanical Engineers, and was commander of 101 Logistic Brigade based in Aldershot. During the COVID-19 pandemic, Prosser was head of the Army's Operation Iron Viper to help Britain's National Health Service administer vaccines against the coronavirus.

Early life and education
Phillip Prosser is from Llanelli, Wales. He was educated at Bryngwyn Comprehensive  before attending Welbeck College in Leicestershire where he completed his A Levels. Prosser then attended the Royal Military Academy Sandhurst where he was commissioned as a Second Lieutenant in 1992. He later attended The Royal Military College of Science at Shrivenham gaining a degree in mechanical engineering. He later completed an MBA from the Open University. He is a chartered mechanical engineer.

Career
Major General Prosser was the former commander of the British Army's 101 Logistic Brigade. He was commissioned in the Royal Electrical and Mechanical Engineers in 1992 and completed operational tours of Bosnia Kosovo War, Iraq and Afghanistan. In 2010-11 he attended the Advanced Command Staff Course for military officers tipped for senior leadership roles.

He helped to distribute PPE to hospitals during the first coronavirus lockdown in March 2020.

In 2021 he was appointed head of the Army's Operation Iron Viper to help Britain's NHS administer COVID-19 vaccines during the coronavirus pandemic in the UK.

He was appointed CBE in the 2021 New Year Honours.

Brigadier Prosser was promoted to Major General on 13 February 2023, as he took up the position as Director Joint Support at United Kingdom Strategic Command.

References

External links 
Twitter

Royal Logistic Corps officers
Royal Electrical and Mechanical Engineers officers
Alumni of the Open University
Alumni of Cranfield University
Living people
Year of birth missing (living people)
Commanders of the Order of the British Empire
Welsh soldiers
People from Llanelli
Welsh mechanical engineers
People educated at Welbeck Defence Sixth Form College